The Greene Man is a public house in London's Euston Road.  It was formerly known as the Green Man (and Porters Bar) and before that, the Farthing Pie House or Pye House as mutton pies could be bought there for a farthing.  When it was established in the 18th century, the area was rural and so the surroundings were farm fields and pleasure gardens.  The place was then frequented by notable artists and writers including William Blake and Richard Wilson.

Farthing Pie House
There has been a tavern in this location for centuries.  It was founded in 1708 as the Farthing Pie House or Pye House.  This was a common name for a place where a mutton pie could be bought for a farthing.

It was mentioned by Henry Carey in his prelude to his popular song, "Sally in our Alley", which was written around 1716.  Carey explained the song's inspiration – a shoemaker's apprentice taking his sweetheart on a tour of London's sights which finished with "proceeding to the Farthing Pye-house, he gave her a Collation of Buns, Cheesecakes, Gammon of Bacon, Stuff’d-beef, and Bottled-ale;"  Defoe's 1722 novel Colonel Jack also alludes to the tavern, when young Jack crosses London into a large field named after it.

The most famous landlord in this period was Mr Price, who was known for his skill in making music by beating a salt-box with a rolling pin, accompanying musicians such as Carl Friedrich Abel, who played the violoncello.

The tavern appears on Rocque's map of 1746 on the corner of the Green Lane with the East-West track which was later to become the New Road.  The place then had a walled garden.  Bilson's Farm is shown on the other side of the junction – a farm of 133 acres which later became part of Regent's Park.  There are no other buildings nearby as the area was not yet developed, the surroundings were still open fields, ponds and tracks.  The area was described in the recollections of John Thomas Smith:

Green Man
The radical MP John Wilkes campaigned there for election to the Middlesex constituency as the suffrage was limited to  wealthy freeholders who could be found there.  At the end of the 18th century, it was frequented by William Blake as a young man.  In 1809, it was renamed the Green Man.  The Welsh painter Richard Wilson played skittles there.

The pub is now owned by Greene King who changed the spelling of the sign to match their name, when they took over the Spirit Pub Company in 2015 and retired the Taylor Walker brewery brand.   In 2019, the cheapest pie on the menu is Woodland Mushroom & Ale which costs £10.99.  As there were 960 farthings in a pound sterling, the nominal price of a pie has risen by a factor of over 10,000.

References

External links
 

Pubs in the London Borough of Camden